Parliamentary elections were held in Abkhazia on 4 March 2007, with a second round in seventeen constituencies on 18 March.

Electoral system
The 35 members of the People's Assembly were elected in single-member constituencies using the two-round system. A total of 189 polling stations were used for the elections, with 129,650 registered voters.

Campaign
A total of 136 candidates were nominated, including 26 MPs. The Community Party was the only party to formally nominate candidates, with all other candidates nominated by initiative groups. The Central Election Commission approved the registration of 130 candidates, of which 22 withdrew before election day. They included 92 Abkhazians, 10 Armenians, 5 Georgians, 4 Russians and one Ukrainian. President Sergei Bagapsh stressed the necessity of having a multi-ethnic parliament, where all the minorities were represented. He also stated that the prevailing issue of the election campaign was achieving international recognition for the de facto independent state.

Three parties supported Bagapsh; the United Abkhazia, Aitaira and Amtsakhara, whilst the Forum of Abkhaz People’s Unity supported Vice President Raul Khadjimba.

Results
Of the 35 elected members, 28 supported President Bagapsh, seven the opposition. 26 were ethnic Abkhaz, three Russian, three Armenian, two Georgian and one Turkish. Voter turnout was 47.25% in the first round.

By district

 Communist Party nominee

 Incumbent

 Backed by pro-presidential parties

Reactions
Neither Georgia nor the EU recognised the elections citing a lack of participation by Georgian refugees.

See also
4th convocation of the People's Assembly of Abkhazia

References

2007
parliamentary